Milles is a village in northwestern Syria, administratively belonging to the Idlib Governorate. The village is 18 km from the city of Idlib, 120 km west of Aleppo, and is in between Idlib{to 18 km } and Salqeen{to 35 km }. Milles is near to Turkey and is located between two mountains. Baresh is the first and Alaly is the second. According to the Syria Central Bureau of Statistics, the town had a population of 2,938 in the 2004 census. This village has a small hill covered by thousand of olive trees.

References

Populated places in Harem District